These women won the TVyNovelas Award for executing the best performance by a woman in her debut telenovela.

Winners and nominees

1980s

1990s

2000s

2010s

Records 
 Most nominated actress: Angélica Rivera with 2 nominations.
 Youngest winner: Samadhi, 14 years old.
 Youngest nominee: Ana Paula Martínez, 9 years old.
 Oldest winner: Montserrat Oliver, 35 years old.
 Oldest nominee: Gina Morett, 41 years old.
 Actresses that winning the award for the same role: Thalía (Quinceañera, 1988) and Ana Layevska (Primer amor... a mil por hora, 2001)
 Actresses winning this category, despite having been as a main villain:
 Anna Silvetti (La pasión de Isabela, 1985)
 Elvira Monsell (Amor en silencio, 1989)
 Ana Colchero (Corazón salvaje, 1994)
 Actresses was nominated in this category, despite having played as a main villain:
 Chantal Andere (Dulce desafío, 1990)
 Alejandra Procuna (Cenizas y diamantes, 1991)
 Paulina Rubio (Baila conmigo, 1993)
 Nicky Mondellini (María Mercedes, 1993)
 Claudia Silva (Volver a Empezar, 1995)
 Nora Salinas (Confidente de secundaria, 1997)
 Eugenia Cauduro (Alguna vez tendremos alas, 1998)
 Aracely Arámbula (Soñadoras, 1999)
 Lili Goret (Juro que te amo, 2009)
 Malillany Marín (Hasta que el dinero nos separe, 2010)
 Carmen Aub (Esperanza del corazón, 2012)
Foreign winning actress:
 Anna Silvetti from Spain
 Sabine Moussier from Germany
 Bárbara Mori from Uruguay
 Ana Layevska from Ukraine
 Laura Carmine from Puerto Rico

References

External links 
TVyNovelas at esmas.com
TVyNovelas Awards at the univision.com

Female Revelation
Revelation Female
Awards established in 1983
Television debuts
Awards for actresses

actriz revelación